Charles Joseph Crist Jr. (born July 24, 1956) is an American attorney and politician who served as the 44th governor of Florida from 2007 to 2011 and as the U.S. representative for  from 2017 to 2022. Crist has been a member of the Democratic Party since 2012; he was previously a Republican before becoming an independent in 2010.

Crist served in the Florida Senate from 1993 to 1999, vacating his seat to run unsuccessfully against incumbent Bob Graham for the U.S. Senate in 1998. He won a 2000 special election to serve as Florida Education Commissioner from 2001 to 2003 and a 2002 election to serve as Florida Attorney General from 2003 to 2007. He was elected Governor of Florida in 2006 after winning against Democrat Jim Davis.

While he was governor, Crist again ran for the U.S. Senate in 2010. He initially led in polls in the race for the Republican nomination, but was later overtaken by Marco Rubio. In April of that year, he left the Republican Party to run in the general election as an independent, losing to Rubio in a three-way race. He took 30% of the vote to Rubio's 49% and Democratic nominee Kendrick Meek had 20%. Crist's term as governor ended in January 2011.

On December 7, 2012, Crist joined the Democratic Party, having endorsed President Barack Obama for reelection in 2012. On November 1, 2013, he announced that he was running for governor in the 2014 election. Crist lost to Republican Governor Rick Scott, his successor, by a 1% margin. In 2016, Crist was elected to Congress from his home district, the St. Petersburg-based 13th, defeating incumbent Republican David Jolly, 52%–48% and becoming the first Democrat to represent this district since 1955. In the 117th Congress, Crist was the only former governor serving in the House.

Crist was the Democratic nominee in the 2022 Florida gubernatorial election, resigning from the House in August 2022 to focus on his campaign. He was defeated in a landslide by incumbent governor Ron DeSantis.

Early life and education
Crist was born in Altoona, Pennsylvania, on July 24, 1956, to Charles Joseph Crist, an American physician of Greek Cypriot and Lebanese descent, and Nancy (née Lee), of Scots-Irish, Swiss, and Welsh descent. His family name is adapted from the original Greek name "Christodoulos". As a child, Crist moved to St. Petersburg, Florida, where he attended Riviera Middle School and St. Petersburg High School, from which he graduated in 1974. He is the second of four children and has three sisters: Margaret Crist Wood, Elizabeth Crist Hyden, and Catherine Crist Kennedy. He attended Wake Forest University for two years. While at Wake Forest, Crist was a walk-on quarterback for the Demon Deacons during his freshman and sophomore years, before transferring to Florida State University in Tallahassee. Crist earned his undergraduate degree from Florida State, where he was elected vice president of the student body and joined the Pi Kappa Alpha fraternity. He received his J.D. from Samford University Cumberland School of Law.

Early career 
After graduating from Cumberland School of Law in 1981, and passing the bar on his third attempt, Crist was hired as general counsel to Minor League Baseball, which was headquartered in St. Petersburg. Drawn to politics, Crist was a candidate for public office for the first time in 1986, in the Republican primary for a state Senate seat in Pinellas County. After losing in a runoff, Crist joined his brother-in-law in private practice in St. Petersburg, but soon returned to politics as an aide on the successful 1988 United States Senate campaign of Connie Mack III, whom he has since described as his political mentor.

Florida Senate

In 1992, Crist was elected to a two-year term to the Florida Senate from the 20th district, which encompassed parts of St. Petersburg and South Tampa. He defeated longtime incumbent Democratic State Senator Helen Gordon Davis of Tampa, 58.3 to 41.7%. Crist was able to unseat Gordon Davis following the 1992 decennial redistricting process, which significantly reconfigured the districts in the Tampa Bay area. His victory was credited with helping to end the Democratic Party's 128-year control of the Florida Senate, as the Republicans netted three seats in 1992, resulting in a 20–20 tie between the parties.

Crist was known as a law-and-order senator, sponsoring legislation requiring inmates to serve at least 85% of their sentences before becoming eligible for parole. He supported teacher salary increases, charter schools, and a specialty license plate for Everglades conservation. With Crist as chairman, the Senate Ethics and Elections Committee investigated actions of then-governor Lawton Chiles amid allegations that Chiles's campaign had made "scare calls" to senior citizens days before the 1994 gubernatorial election. Chiles testified before the committee and admitted that his campaign had made the calls.

In 1994, Crist was reelected to a four-year term in the Senate, defeating Democrat Dana Lynn Maley with 63.3% of the vote.

U.S. Senate campaign and Florida Education Commissioner

Crist gained recognition in 1998 as the Republican challenger to incumbent Democratic U.S. Senator Bob Graham. Crist campaigned conservatively on taxation, crime, and the ongoing Lewinsky scandal, but agreed with Graham on issues such as healthcare and statehood for Puerto Rico. Crist also campaigned on being younger, more energetic, and more able to address Floridians' needs. He lost to Graham by 26 percentage points, but gained significant name recognition, and was appointed by Governor Jeb Bush to serve as the Deputy Secretary of the Florida Department of Business and Professional Regulation in 1999 upon the conclusion of his Senate service. He served until 2000, when he ran for Florida Education Commissioner in a November special election created by the resignation of incumbent Commissioner Tom Gallagher. He won by over 500,000 votes and assumed the office in January 2001. Crist would ultimately be the last statewide elected education commissioner, as a 1998 amendment to the Constitution of Florida turned the position into one appointed by the Governor of Florida after his departure. Crist left the office after he was elected attorney general in 2002.

Florida Attorney General
In 2002, Crist was elected Florida Attorney General. His candidacy was supported by the host of America's Most Wanted, John Walsh. Walsh and other supporters cited his work with the Center for Missing and Exploited Children.

Civil rights and consumer groups praised Crist for expanding the attorney general's powers during his time in office. These powers enabled him and future attorneys general to have greater power to prosecute civil rights and fraud cases. Crist also worked to combat email spam, freeze utility rates, end telecom deception, and protect the environment.

Governor of Florida

Tenure
Crist was elected to the governorship of Florida in the 2006 election, defeating Democrat Jim Davis 52-45%. In his inaugural pledge to the people of Florida, he promised to lower taxes, improve the state education system, reduce crime, lower drug costs, expand access to health insurance, assist senior citizens, and protect the environment. However, his promise to lower taxes would prove to be difficult to keep during the Great Recession, and he eventually relented in 2009 after being sent a budget by the Florida legislature which included a 2.2 billion dollar raise in taxes and fees. He also had a mixed record on environmental issues. Nonetheless, Crist remained widely popular with Floridians during his term, and an April 2009 poll showed him with a 68 percent approval rating among Republicans and independents and a 66 percent approval rating among Democrats. Crist drew criticism from the right for supporting the Obama administration's economic stimulus plan. In 2010, rather than seek reelection as governor, he left the Republican Party to run for the Senate as an Independent. Shortly thereafter, Crist announced that he had moderated his views against LGBT adoption and marriage.

Fundraising controversies
In February 2006, Crist attended a fundraiser at Mar-A-Lago, hosted by Donald Trump, with guests paying $500 to attend. Two of the guests became subjects of controversy. Crist returned $1,000 in campaign contributions to one of those guests as a result.

In 2009, Crist saw the man he had chosen as Florida GOP finance chairman, his former fraternity brother, oil magnate Harry Sargeant III, forced to step down. One of Sargeant's employees, Ala'a al-Ali of the Dominican Republic, was indicted in Los Angeles for organizing $5,000 in illegal campaign contributions to Crist, as well as $50,000 to presidential candidates Hillary Clinton, John McCain and Rudy Giuliani.

Role in the 2008 presidential election

Senator John McCain endorsed Crist's 2006 campaign for governor, traveling the state to campaign with him. The day before the general election, Crist held a campaign event with McCain in Jacksonville. Later, when the Republican presidential primary debates were held in St. Petersburg, Crist embraced McCain. Former New York City Mayor Rudy Giuliani, who had also campaigned for Crist during the gubernatorial election, had sought his endorsement.

In May 2007, Crist signed legislation moving the date of Florida's presidential primary to January 29, 2008, contrary to national political party rules. Crist joined Michigan governor Jennifer Granholm in asking that their states' delegates be seated. Both national conventions ended up seating all delegates, but with only a half vote each for the sanctioned states.

On January 26, 2008, Crist endorsed McCain in the Republican primary. McCain won the Florida primary by five percentage points.

On October 28, 2008, Crist extended early voting hours of operation and declared that a "state of emergency exists", due to record voter turnout and resultant hours-long waits at locations throughout the state.

On November 12–14, 2008, Crist hosted the Republican Governors Association (RGA) annual meeting in Miami. Held the week after the Democratic Party victories in the 2008 election, there was speculation about the meeting's tone. Then Alaska Governor Sarah Palin, the defeated 2008 Republican vice presidential nominee, was a featured participant and speaker.

Crist's speech at the RGA conference, "Listen to the Voters and Serve", included his sentiments on how the GOP should evolve:

Crist held a joint interview with Governor Mark Sanford of South Carolina in which they discussed the split in the Republican Party over where to direct the party's efforts to gain more voters.

2010 U.S. Senate campaign

On May 12, 2009, Crist announced that he would not run for reelection as governor in 2010, making him the first Florida governor not to run for reelection since 1964. Instead he ran for the US Senate. His two main opponents were former Florida House Speaker Marco Rubio, and U.S. Representative Kendrick Meek.

Crist was initially the front-runner in the Republican primary, but later trailed Rubio in polls.

Crist announced his intent to run as an unaffiliated candidate in the election, while at the same time, according to a press release from his campaign, he remained a registered Republican. Crist officially changed his registration status to "non party affiliated" on May 13, 2010. He did not return campaign contributions made while he was a Republican. Crist lost the general election, receiving 29.7% of the vote to Rubio's 48.9% and Meek's 20.2%.

In April 2011, as part of a settlement of a copyright lawsuit brought by musician David Byrne, Crist apologized for his Senate campaign's use of Byrne's song "Road to Nowhere" without permission.

By the spring of 2015, there was speculation that Crist would seek the Democratic nomination for the 2016 United States Senate election in Florida. This would have been his third run for the seat (he lost in 1998 and 2010). In March 2015, Crist said he would not seek the nomination. In the same month he endorsed U.S. Congressman Patrick Murphy's Senate candidacy.

Hiatus (2011–2014)
In January 2011, Crist joined the Tampa office of national personal injury law firm Morgan & Morgan after expressing an interest in returning to the legal field during his final week in office as governor of Florida. Crist worked primarily in the firm's class-action sector as a complex-litigation attorney, serving as a "rainmaker" for the firm. In November 2016, after almost six years with the firm, he was elected to represent Florida's 13th congressional district. In February 2018, Brad Slager of Sunshine State News, cited evidence that Morgan & Morgan was "attempting to purge all evidence" of its relationship with Crist now that he was a "rookie congressman" with "little-to-no power".

In 2013, Crist performed paid consulting work for Coastal Construction, a Miami-based construction firm owned by Crist's longtime friend Tom Murphy, the father of former U.S. Representative Patrick Murphy.

Crist has been a part-time guest lecturer at Stetson University College of Law, with the title of Distinguished Professorial Lecturer.

In August 2012, Crist endorsed President Obama in his campaign for reelection over Republican nominee Mitt Romney, saying that the Republican Party "pitched so far to the extreme right on issues important to women, immigrants, seniors and students that they've proven incapable of governing for the people." Crist was a speaker at the 2012 Democratic National Convention in Charlotte, North Carolina, saying, "I didn't leave the Republican Party; it left me."

Party switch and The Party's Over
On December 7, 2012, Crist announced that he had joined the Democratic Party. In July 2013, Crist began writing a book, with Newsday columnist Ellis Henican, about his political transition. The book, The Party's Over: How the Extreme Right Hijacked the GOP and I Became a Democrat, was released in February 2014. In the book, Crist claimed that his career in the Republican Party was destroyed by a hug between him and Obama at a Fort Myers town hall on February 10, 2009. "It was the kind of hug I'd exchanged with thousands and thousands of Floridians over the years", Crist wrote. "I didn't think a thing about it as it was happening." But it "ended my viable life as a Republican politician. I would never have a future in my old party again. My bipartisan hopes and dreams, I would discover soon enough to my shock and disappointment, were vastly overstated and hopelessly out of date."

In May 2014, Crist told Fusion's Jorge Ramos that he had left the Republican Party because of its racial attitudes. "I couldn't be consistent with myself and my core beliefs, and stay with a party that was so unfriendly toward the African-American president—I'll just go there", Crist said. "I was a Republican and I saw the activists and what they were doing. It was intolerable to me." The Washington Post Chris Cillizza rejected this claim, citing Tampa Bay Times political editor Adam Smith as saying that Crist "was happy as a Republican when the polls showed him leading Marco Rubio by 20 points." Cilizza wrote that Crist's party switch "epitomized for many within the Republican base that Crist lacked any core principles or beliefs and, instead, simply went with whatever was popular at the moment."

In a review in The New Republic, Isaac Chotiner called The Party's Over "a dishonest and boring memoir" by "a man with no convictions". Writing in Rolling Stone magazine in 2014, Jeb Lund described Crist as "a Republican conveniently converted to Democrat", adding, "what made Crist dynamic as a Republican ... was a vaguely populist nose-thumbing at Republican orthodoxy", and that "Charlie Crist is a Democrat only if you are a Republican."

2014 gubernatorial election

On November 1, 2013, Crist filed to run for governor as a Democrat. He won the Democratic nomination but was defeated in the general election by Republican incumbent Rick Scott. Crist holds the rare distinction of losing a statewide general election in Florida as a Republican, a Democrat and an Independent.

U.S. House of Representatives

Elections

2016
On October 20, 2015, Crist announced that he would seek the Democratic nomination for Florida's 13th congressional district, his home district, in the 2016 U.S. House of Representatives elections. He had previously announced on Twitter that he would not run for political office in 2016. Republican incumbent David Jolly, who succeeded 43-year incumbent Bill Young in a 2014 special election, was vacating the seat to run for the same Senate seat for which Crist ran in 1998 and 2010.

But when Senator Marco Rubio decided to run for reelection, Jolly dropped out of the Senate race and sought reelection to the House, even though the 13th district had become significantly friendlier to Democrats when a court tossed out Florida's original congressional map. The new map drew nearly all of St. Petersburg, along with most of the more Democratic southern portion of Pinellas County, into the 13th. The district had been in Republican hands without interruption since 1955, and had been one of the first areas of Florida to turn Republican. However, it had become more of a swing district at the presidential level since the 1990s; it has supported a Democrat for president in all but one election since 1992.

In the general election, Crist defeated Jolly 52–48%, becoming the first Democrat to win the seat in 62 years.

2018
In 2018, Crist was endorsed by the League of Conservation Voters (LCV) Action Fund, which called him "a leader on protecting Florida from and planning for the impacts of climate change during his time as Governor and in Congress." Crist won a second term with 57 percent of the vote.

Tenure
Crist was sworn in on January 3, 2017. He was a member of the Blue Dog Coalition, the New Democrat Coalition, the Climate Solutions Caucus and the U.S.-Japan Caucus.

On December 18, 2019, Crist voted for both articles of impeachment against President Donald Trump.

On January 13, 2021, Crist voted in favor of the single article of impeachment against President Trump during the second impeachment of Donald Trump.

Crist introduced H.R. 305, which presented the Congressional Gold Medal to Officer Eugene Goodman for his valor during the January 6 United States Capitol attack.

On August 31, 2022, Crist resigned from Congress to focus on his gubernatorial campaign.

Committee assignments
 Committee on Appropriations
 Subcommittee on Defense
 Subcommittee on Commerce, Justice, Science, and Related Agencies
 Subcommittee on Financial Services and General Government
 Committee on Science, Space, and Technology
 Subcommittee on Environment
 Subcommittee on Space and Aeronautics

Caucus memberships
 New Democrat Coalition
 Blue Dog Coalition
 Climate Solutions Caucus
 U.S.-Japan Caucus

2022 gubernatorial election 

On May 4, 2021, Crist announced his intention to run for the Democratic nomination in the 2022 Florida gubernatorial election against incumbent Ron DeSantis. "[I'm] running on decency and mutual respect," Crist explained. "I love people. And I feel for ’em right now. Gay people. Women. Blacks. They’re getting the crap kicked out of ’em by this guy. It’s wrong. Somebody has to stop him." Crist won the primary election on August23, 2022, and advanced to face DeSantis in the general election on November 8, 2022. Crist's running mate for lieutenant governor was union leader Karla Hernández-Mats, president of the United Teachers of Dade. However, Crist was defeated by DeSantis, receiving 40% of the vote compared to DeSantis's 59%.

Political positions

Abortion
In 1995, while in the Florida Senate, Crist joined with two Democrats in the Senate Health Care Committee in voting against a proposal for a mandatory 24-hour waiting period before a woman could have an abortion, resulting in a 3–3 tie vote and the bill's defeat.

In 1998, while running for the U.S. Senate, Crist wrote in a Tampa Bay Times questionnaire: "I believe that a woman has the right to choose, but would prefer only after careful consideration and consultation with her family, her physician and her clergy; not her government." In a debate that year, he said he did not support a constitutional amendment banning abortion. In 2006, while running for governor, Crist said he did not support overturning Roe v. Wade and opposed a mandatory 24-hour waiting period before a woman could have an abortion.

In 2006, Crist's stance on abortion was characterized as unclear.

In early 2010, Crist said he would "fight for pro-life legislative efforts" and described himself as "pro-life".

By March 2010, however, as rumors swirled that he would leave the Republican Party and become an independent, Crist reiterated that he did not support overturning Roe v. Wade and told a Christian Family Coalition group, "We ought to, instead of change laws, change hearts."

In June 2010, after leaving the Republican Party and becoming an independent, Crist vetoed a bill that would have required, at patient cost, an ultrasound in order to receive an abortion. He called the measure "punitive" and "almost mean-spirited". The bill also included language barring abortion coverage "under a contract toward which any tax credit or cost-sharing credit is applied."

Capital punishment
As governor, Crist supported capital punishment, and he reiterated his support for it in October 2022.

Cuba
In May 2014, Crist publicly supported lifting the United States embargo against Cuba, arguing it has not helped to change the Cuban government. He had supported the embargo earlier as both a Republican and independent. Also in 2014, he announced he had requested the Department of State's permission to travel to Cuba with a delegation of business, academic and economic development officials. In June, Crist indefinitely postponed the trip.

In 2019, Crist quietly visited Cuba to meet with Cuban officials, despite high bilateral tensions due to alleged Cuban support for the Maduro regime in Venezuela. The three-day trip was not announced by his congressional office and was disclosed due to required filings in the House of Representatives Committee on Ethics, with no details about it on Crist's House website. The trip was sponsored by the Center for Democracy in the Americas, an organization that "promotes a U.S. policy toward Cuba based on engagement and recognition of Cuba's sovereignty", according to its website. Photos of Crist smiling during a meeting with Cuban officials, including Cuban Foreign Minister Bruno Rodríguez, were published in the official newspaper of Cuba's Communist Party during his stay.

Environmental policy
In June 2008, Crist proposed that Florida buy  from the United States Sugar Corporation for $1.75 billion. The proposed purchase would have removed about 187,000 acres of sugar farming for Everglades restoration efforts.

In 2007, Crist signed executive orders to impose stricter air pollution standards in Florida, with an aim to reduce greenhouse gas emissions. In his gubernatorial campaign, he opposed offshore oil drilling. He altered that position in June 2008, when oil reached peak prices, saying, "I mean, let's face it, the price of gas has gone through the roof, and Florida families are suffering, and my heart bleeds for them."

Fiscal policies
Crist supported President Obama's American Recovery and Reinvestment Act of 2009, a stimulus package in response to the Great Recession. Fellow Republicans were angered by Crist's support for the stimulus.

Crist called the act a "godsend", maintaining that it had saved the jobs of nearly 20,000 Florida schoolteachers and other school workers in 2009–2010.

Felons' voting rights
In a February 12, 2018, USA Today op-ed, Crist wrote that Florida was "one of only three states that permanently bans non-violent, ex-felons from voting" and that this "disenfranchisement of 1.5 million of our fellow citizens is shameful."

Gun policy
In 2008, Crist signed a provision preventing employers from prohibiting employees from bringing firearms to the workplace, as long as the weapons are secure and the employees have a concealed carry license.

After the December 2012 Sandy Hook Elementary School shooting, Crist announced a reversal of some of his previous stances on gun control. Before 2012, he had sometimes accused his opponents of not supporting gun rights strongly enough. He was endorsed by the NRA in 2006. In 2012, Crist announced that he supported reinstating the Federal Assault Weapons Ban, banning high-capacity magazines, and instating more extensive background checks. In the wake of the Stoneman Douglas High School shooting, he announced his support for additional measures, including a ban on bump stocks, and also said he did not support arming teachers.

When he left office as governor in 2011, Crist had an A rating from the NRA. In 2016, he received an F rating from the NRA.

Immigration
In June 2017, Crist was one of 24 House Democrats to vote for Kate's Law. The next month, he was one of five Democrats to vote to fund President Trump's border wall, and the next day, issued a statement saying that he opposed the wall.

LGBT rights
In 2006, as a proposed state constitutional amendment banning same-sex unions was headed to the ballot in Florida, Crist said that such an amendment was unnecessary because state law already barred same-sex marriages. But in September 2005, he had signed a petition for the amendment during the Republican primary at the Christian Coalition's request. Crist said in campaign materials at the time that he supported "traditional marriage". In 2008, he said he voted for the amendment, which passed.

In a debate and a radio talk show appearance in 2006, Crist indicated support for civil unions.

As governor, Crist downplayed the marriage issue, saying in a late 2007 CNN appearance: "It's not an issue that moves me. I'm just a live-and-let-live kind of guy."

For some time Crist supported Florida's ban on same-sex adoption, which had been in place since 1977. He publicly expressed support for the ban beginning when he was attorney general in 2006.

In 2008, Crist again announced his support for the Federal Marriage Amendment. Also that year, he told the Orlando Sentinel that the issue was not "top-tier" for him, even as he supported a Florida ballot measure to amend the state constitution prohibiting same-sex marriage that passed later that year.

Also in 2008, in the case of In re Gill, a Miami-Dade judge struck down the ban on same-sex couple adoption. As the case proceeded through appeals, Crist expressed support for the adoption ban as late as February 2010, but by June 2010, expressed openness to changing Florida law to allow same-sex adoption, saying a better approach "would be to let judges make that decision on a case-by-case basis."

In September 2010, Crist said that he had had an "appropriate evolution" on gay rights and was considering dropping the state's appeal of to block gay adoption. Days later, after an appeals court affirmed gay couples had a right to adopt, Crist hailed the ruling "a very good day for Florida" and "a great day for children" and announced that the state would no longer seek to enforce the ban. In a Senate debate the next month, he attributed his shift in positions to "the convergence of life experience and wisdom", saying he had become more tolerant and become less judgmental with age.

At about the same time in 2010, he declared his support for civil unions encompassing "the full range of legal protections" including "access to a loved one in the hospital, inheritance rights, the fundamental things people need to take care of their families." The voter-enacted 2008 state constitutional amendment Crist supported may nonetheless have prohibited them.

On May 9, 2013, Crist announced that he supports same-sex marriage: "I most certainly support marriage equality in Florida and look forward to the day it happens here."

In January 2014, Crist apologized for his support for the 2008 same-sex marriage ban and for the same-sex adoption ban, telling an Orlando LGBT publication: "I'm sorry I did that. It was a mistake. I was wrong. Please forgive me."

Marijuana legalization
Crist said "fully legalizing marijuana" would bring about "true justice in our state and in our country" in announcing his candidacy for governor in 2021. He also voted for the Marijuana Opportunity Reinvestment and Expungement (MORE) Act to legalize cannabis at the federal level and expunge cannabis convictions in 2020. In 2018, he introduced the Fairness in Federal Drug Testing Under State Laws Act to limit the firing of federal workers and denial of applicants for cannabis use.

Other issues
As governor, Crist supported capital punishment.

After claims that computerized voting machines undercounted votes in black communities, Crist endorsed legislation requiring paper records of all ballots cast in elections.

In April 2010, Crist vetoed an education bill that would have linked teacher pay to test scores, a piece of legislation conservatives strongly supported.

Crist supported increased regulation of the insurance industry, including property insurance rates (in the aftermath of Hurricane Katrina) and health insurance. The Citizen's Property Insurance Corp and the Florida Hurricane Catastrophe Fund had been described as risky and underfunded. Standing next to former football star Dan Marino (whose son, Michael, is autistic and inspired the Dan Marino Foundation), Crist signed a law expanding health coverage statewide for autism disorders and legislation expanding low-income coverage and creating public and private insurance options in Florida.

The abortion hurdles bill Crist vetoed in June 2010 also included some provisions "intended to thwart" the Affordable Care Act, the federal health care reform legislation championed by President Obama.

In April 2022, Crist said he opposed the repeal of the Reedy Creek Improvement Act, arguing that it would hurt Florida's economy and tourism.

Personal life
In July 1979, Crist married Amanda Morrow. They divorced within a year.

Crist became engaged to Carole Rome on July 3, 2008, after nine months of dating, and they married on December 12 of that year at the First Methodist Church of St. Petersburg, of which Crist is a member. In February 2017, Crist announced that he had filed for divorce, and the divorce was completed that year.

In 2022, while running for governor again, Crist said he was engaged to a woman he met in 2017, who is a mother of six children and a medical sonographer.

Electoral history

Books
 The Party's Over: How the Extreme Right Hijacked the GOP and I Became a Democrat (2014)

See also
 List of Arab and Middle-Eastern Americans in the United States Congress
 List of American politicians who switched parties in office

References

External links

 Charlie Crist for Governor campaign website
 

 

|-

|-

|-

|-

|-

|-

|-

|-

|-

|-

|-

1956 births
20th-century American politicians
20th-century Methodists
21st-century American politicians
21st-century Methodists
American football quarterbacks
American people of Greek Cypriot descent
American people of Scotch-Irish descent
American people of Swiss descent
American people of Welsh descent
American politicians of Lebanese descent
American United Methodists
Candidates in the 1998 United States elections
Candidates in the 2010 United States elections
Candidates in the 2014 United States elections
Candidates in the 2022 United States elections
Cumberland School of Law alumni
Educators from Pennsylvania
Florida Attorneys General
Florida Commissioners of Education
Democratic Party members of the United States House of Representatives from Florida
Florida Democrats
Florida Independents
Florida Republicans
Florida state senators
Florida State University alumni
Governors of Florida
Independent state governors of the United States
Living people
Methodists from Florida
Politicians from Altoona, Pennsylvania
Politicians from St. Petersburg, Florida
Republican Party governors of Florida
St. Petersburg High School alumni
Wake Forest Demon Deacons football players